The men's 800 metres event at the 1995 Pan American Games was held at the Estadio Atletico "Justo Roman" on 22 and 23 March.

Medalists

Results

Heats

Final

References

Athletics at the 1995 Pan American Games
1995